Aleksandr Valerevich Gorbatikov (born 4 June 1982) is a Russian handball player who competed in the 2004 Summer Olympics.

He was born in Volgograd.

In 2004 he was a member of the Russian team which won the bronze medal in the Olympic tournament. He played one match.

References

External links 
 
 
 

1982 births
Living people
Russian male handball players
Olympic handball players of Russia
Olympic bronze medalists for Russia
Olympic medalists in handball
Handball players at the 2004 Summer Olympics
Medalists at the 2004 Summer Olympics
Sportspeople from Volgograd